The Commission for Communications Regulation (ComReg) is the general communications regulator for Ireland, covering almost all possible types of communications.

Founded on 1 December 2002, ComReg took over from the Office of the Director of Telecommunications Regulation (ODTR), amongst other bodies. The ODTR was established in 1997 to take over the licensing and regulatory functions of the Minister for Transport, Energy and Communication which related primarily to broadcasting and communications. The first (and only) Director of Telecommunications Regulation was Etain Doyle, who was subsequently appointed Chairperson of ComReg, on its establishment.

Under the Communications Regulation Act, 2002 the Minister for Communications, Marine, and Natural Resources appoints the chairperson and up to two other commissioners of ComReg. Currently the commissioners are Garrett Blaney, Jeremy Godfrey and Robert Mourik
Sectors regulated by ComReg include post, telecoms, internet, cable television, terrestrial television, radio and domain name under the Communications Regulation Act, 2002 (No. 20 of 2002), S.I. No. 510 of 2002 Communications Regulation Act 2002 (Establishment Day) Order 2002 and other acts. For a full list of legislation underpinning ComReg's responsibilities.

ComReg set prices, allocate frequencies, and issue licenses to those involved in these sectors and provides statistical data, consumer product price comparisons to assist consumers in achieving value for money on a fair basis. In relation to terrestrial television and radio, the commission acts in conjunction with the Broadcasting Authority of Ireland. After the enactment of the Broadcasting Act 2009 RTÉ and TG4 authorities were disbanded and now come under the Broadcasting Authority of Ireland's remit.

ComReg is also tasked with enforcing wireless telegraphy legislation, in particular the Wireless Telegraphy Act, 1926, in relation to use of the radio spectrum, which includes actions against pirate radio stations, distributors of mobile phone repeaters and other unlicensed users of radio spectrum.

See also
 Communications in Ireland

References

External links
 

Communications authorities
Government agencies of the Republic of Ireland
Mass media in the Republic of Ireland
Communications in the Republic of Ireland
Telecommunications in the Republic of Ireland
Department of the Environment, Climate and Communications
Regulation in Ireland
2002 establishments in Ireland
Government agencies established in 2002